Malmella strigiprima is a moth of the Megalopygidae family. It was described by Paul Dognin in 1914. It is found in Colombia.

References

Moths described in 1914
Megalopygidae